Atherigona approximata, the pearl millet shoot fly, is a species of fly in the family Muscidae. The larvae feed on the central growing shoots of crops such as pearl millet and sorghum. It is found in South Asia.

See also
List of pearl millet diseases

References

Muscidae
Insect pests of millets
Taxa named by Francis Walker (entomologist)
Taxa named by John Russell Malloch